Cox Island is a northern Canadian island in eastern Hudson Bay and forms part of the Qikiqtaaluk Region.

References

Islands of Hudson Bay
Uninhabited islands of Qikiqtaaluk Region